Nicholas County High School is a high school located in Summersville, West Virginia.

Nicholas County High School has seen a steady decline in student enrollment like many schools throughout West Virginia. NCHS has 693 students, a drop from 720 in the 2015-2016 school enrollment period. Due to this drop the school currently ranks as a AA school down from a AAA.  The mascot for NCHS is the grizzly bear, and its school colors are Old Gold and Old Navy.

As a result of flood damage to Richwood High School in June 2016, plans were made to consolidate RHS with NCHS on a new campus. The planned consolidation, however, was rejected by the West Virginia Board of Education on June 13, 2017. On June 2nd, 2020, the Nicholas County Board of Education broke ground on a new campus for NCHS and Summersville Middle School (which was destroyed in the flood of 2016 and had to be placed in a modular setting) at Glade Creek. The current NCHS campus will be remodeled to house Summersville Elementary School.

In 2008 Nicholas County High School was listed in the top 10% of high schools in the United States by U.S. News & World Report. NCHS was one of the few schools to be included on the list, and the only school in the Nicholas County School System.

Extracurriculars 
Nicholas County's  Future Problem Solvers Team has placed 12th in the world and won two first place titles and one second place title at the 2013 West Virginia FBLA Conference.

Sports 
NCHS placed 16th in the West Virginia Secondary School Activities Commission Football Tournament in 2007, 12th place in 2008, 8th in 2009, and 9th in 2012, as well as 8th in the WVSSAC Cheerleading Tournament in 2007.
Sports offered at NCHS are:
Football
Cheerleading
Volleyball
Soccer
Golf
Wrestling
Basketball
Softball
Baseball
Track and field
Cross country

Marching band 
The Nicholas County High School Marching Grizzlies have placed in many different marching band competitions, including Black Walnut Festival and Tri-State. At ratings festival, they received three scores of 1, which is the highest a band can score.
The band was nominated to participate in the 2010 National Independence Day Parade.

The band performed at the 2014 Poca Band Invitational where they were the 1st Runner Up for Grand Champion in Marching for Class C bands; they competed against 3 other bands in their class. Other 2014 competitions which the band participated in were Ripley and Black Walnut.

The current director is Roger Lee Akers, who has served Nicholas County High School since 2004. 

The marching band has also won awards in marching, auxiliary, drumline, drum major, and overall band.

References

External links
Archived website
Official Website

Education in Nicholas County, West Virginia
Public high schools in West Virginia
Buildings and structures in Nicholas County, West Virginia